Chromosome 11 is one of the 23 pairs of chromosomes in humans. Humans normally have two copies of this chromosome. Chromosome 11 spans about 135 million base pairs (the building material of DNA) and represents between 4 and 4.5 percent of the total DNA in cells. The shorter arm (p arm) is termed 11p while the longer arm (q arm) is 11q. At about 21.5 genes per megabase, chromosome 11 is one of the most gene-rich, and disease-rich, chromosomes in the human genome.

More than 40% of the 856 olfactory receptor genes in the human genome are located in 28 single-gene and multi-gene clusters along the chromosome.

Gene

Number of genes
The following are some of the gene count estimates of human chromosome 11. Because researchers use different approaches to genome annotation their predictions of the number of genes on each chromosome varies (for technical details, see gene prediction). Among various projects, the collaborative consensus coding sequence project (CCDS) takes an extremely conservative strategy. So CCDS's gene number prediction represents a lower bound on the total number of human protein-coding genes.

Gene list

The following is a partial list of genes on human chromosome 11. For complete list, see the links in the infobox on the right.

Diseases and disorders

The following diseases and disorders are some of those related to genes on chromosome 11:

 autism (NRXN2)
 acute intermittent porphyria
 albinism
 ataxia–telangiectasia
 Beckwith–Wiedemann syndrome
 Best's disease
 beta-ketothiolase deficiency
 beta thalassemia
 bladder cancer
 breast cancer
 carnitine palmitoyltransferase I deficiency
 Charcot–Marie–Tooth disease
 Cystic fibrosis
 Depression
 Denys–Drash syndrome
 familial Mediterranean fever
 Hereditary angioedema 
 Jacobsen syndrome
 Jervell and Lange-Nielsen syndrome
 Mantle cell lymphoma (t11;14)
 Meckel syndrome
 methemoglobinemia, beta-globin type
 Mixed lineage leukemia
 multiple endocrine neoplasia type 1
 Hereditary multiple exostoses
 Nestor-Guillermo progeria syndrome
 Niemann–Pick disease
 nonsyndromic deafness
 porphyria
 Potocki–Shaffer syndrome
 Romano–Ward syndrome
 Sickle cell anemia
 Smith–Lemli–Opitz syndrome
 tetrahydrobiopterin deficiency
 Usher syndrome
 WAGR syndrome
 Wiedemann–Steiner syndrome
 Wilms' tumor

Cytogenetic band

References

External links

 
 

Chromosome 11